
Gmina Milejewo is a rural gmina (administrative district) in Elbląg County, Warmian-Masurian Voivodeship, in northern Poland.

The gmina contains part of the protected area called Elbląg Upland Landscape Park.

Villages
Gmina Milejewo contains the villages and settlements of Huta Żuławska, Jagodnik, Kamiennik Wielki, Majewo, Majewo-Kolonia, Milejewo, Ogrodniki, Piastowo, Pomorska Wieś, Rakowo, Romanowo, Rychnowy, Starodębie, Stoboje, Stodolniki, Wilkowo, Zajączkowo and Zalesie.

Neighbouring gminas
Gmina Milejewo is bordered by the city of Elbląg and by the gminas of Elbląg, Młynary, Pasłęk and Tolkmicko.

References
Polish official population figures 2006

Milejewo
Elbląg County